Panix may refer to:

Panix (ISP), an internet service provider
 Any of several places in the Grisons, Switzerland
 Pigniu, a village whose German name is Panix
 Panix Pass, a Swiss Alpine pass
 Lag da Pigniu, a reservoir (Panixer Stausee in German)
 A misspelling of Panax, a genus of plants.